Zarna, Iran may refer to:
 Zarnan (disambiguation)
 Zarnaq